The Vinie McCall House is a historic house on Spring Street in Marshall, Arkansas.  It is a -story wood-frame structure, with a side-gable roof, central chimney, weatherboard siding, and stone pier foundation.  The front (west-facing) facade has a cross gable at the center of the roof, with two narrow windows in it, above the main entrance.  The entrance stands under a hip-roof porch roughly the width of the gable, supported by five turned columns and decorated with a spindled frieze.  The house was built c. 1895, and is a well-preserved vernacular house with Folk Victorian details from the late 19th century.

The house was listed on the National Register of Historic Places in 1993.

See also
National Register of Historic Places listings in Searcy County, Arkansas

References

Houses on the National Register of Historic Places in Arkansas
Houses in Searcy County, Arkansas
National Register of Historic Places in Searcy County, Arkansas